The Great Ocean Road is an Australian National Heritage listed  stretch of road along the south-eastern coast of Australia between the Victorian cities of Torquay and Allansford. Built by returned soldiers between 1919 and 1932 and dedicated to soldiers killed during World War I, the road is the world's largest war memorial. Winding through varying terrain along the coast and providing access to several prominent landmarks, including the Twelve Apostles limestone stack formations, the road is an important tourist attraction in the region. In December 2020, legislation went into effect to legally protect the Great Ocean Road – called the “Great Ocean Road Environs Protection Act 2020”.

The city of Geelong, close to Torquay, experiences great benefit from Australian and international visitors to the road; with Geelong Otway Tourism affirming it as an invaluable asset. The Royal Automobile Club of Victoria (RACV) listed the road as the state's top tourism experience in its Victoria 101 survey, based on spots recommended by members and the public on what they would recommend to visitors.

Route
The Great Ocean Road starts at Torquay and travels westward to finish at Allansford near Warrnambool, the largest city along the road. The road is two lanes (one in each direction), and is covered by a speed limit changing between 50 kilometres per hour and 100 kilometres per hour.

The road is considered a tourist attraction in the area, in which much of the road hugs coastline affectionately known as the Surf Coast, between Torquay and Cape Otway, and the Shipwreck Coast further west of Cape Otway, providing visibility of Bass Strait and the Southern Ocean. The road traverses rainforests, as well as beaches and cliffs composed of limestone and sandstone, which is susceptible to erosion. The road travels via Anglesea, Lorne, Apollo Bay, and Port Campbell, the latter being notable for its natural limestone and sandstone rock formations including Loch Ard Gorge, The Grotto, London Arch (formerly London Bridge) and The Twelve Apostles. At the stretch of the Great Ocean Road nearer to Geelong, the road meanders along the coast, with tall, almost-vertical cliffs on the other side of it. Road signs put up along the road warn motorists of possible rockfalls, which have occurred before.

Events

Great Ocean Road Marathon
A 45 kilometre section of the Great Ocean Road, between Lorne and Apollo Bay, is the location of the annual "Great Ocean Road Marathon". First run in 2005, the marathon is part of the Great Ocean Road Running Festival. The course record of 2:27:37 was set in 2019 by English runner Nick Earl. Earl broke the previous record of 2:27:42 set in 2011 by James Kipkelwon of Kenya, who also won the event in 2012.

Cycling Events
In July 2015, former World Road Cycling Champion and Tour de France winner Cadel Evans announced that the Great Ocean Road would play host to the Cadel Evans Great Ocean Road Race in early 2015, including elite races for men and women and a mass participation People's Ride. As of 2019, the People's Ride includes three distance options—35 km, 65 km, or 115 km.

Wiggle Amy's Gran Fondo cycling event is held in September and uses the section between Lorne and Skenes Creek. One of the only cycling events in Australia held on a fully closed road, it is named for Amy Gillett, who was killed in a collision between the Australian women's cycling squad and a driver in Germany in 2005.

History

The Great Ocean Road was first planned towards the end of World War I, when chairman of the Country Roads Board, William Calder, asked the State War Council for funds to be provided for returned soldiers to work on roads in sparsely populated areas in the Western District. At the time, the rugged south-west coast of Victoria was accessible only by sea or rough bush track. It was envisaged that the road would connect isolated settlements on the coast, and become a vital transport link for the timber industry and tourism.

Surveying for the road, tentatively titled the South Coast Road, started in 1918—with the road suggested to travel from Barwon Heads, follow the coast west around Cape Otway, and end near Warrnambool. In 1918, the Great Ocean Road Trust was formed as a private company, under the helm of president Howard Hitchcock. The company managed to secure £81,000 in capital from private subscription and borrowing, with Hitchcock himself contributing £3000. Money would be repaid by charging drivers a toll until the debt was cleared, and the road would then be gifted to the state.

Construction effort

Construction of the road began on 19 September 1919. Approximately 3,000 returned servicemen worked on the project, which was a war memorial for fellow servicemen killed in World War I. An advance survey team progressed through dense scrub at a rate of approximately three kilometres a month. Construction was mostly by hand, using explosives, pick and shovel, wheelbarrows, and some small machinery, and was at times perilous, with several workers being killed. The final sections along steep coastal cliffs were the most difficult to work on. Anecdotal evidence from ABC archives in 1982 suggested workers would rest detonators on their knees during travel, as it was the softest ride for them.

The soldiers were paid 10 shillings and sixpence for an eight-hour day, also working a half-day on Saturdays. They used tents for accommodation throughout, and were provided with meals in a communal dining marquee. Food cost up to 10 shillings a week. Despite the isolation of the camps, the workers had access to a piano, gramophone, games, newspapers and magazines.

In 1924, the coastal steamer Casino became stranded near Cape Patton, after having hit a reef at Point Hawdon, near the Grey River. A legend has it that 500 barrels of beer and 120 cases of spirits were jettisoned and that the road workers salvaged them, resulting in an unscheduled two-week-long drinking break. However, Museums Victoria notes only that most of the cargo, largely composed of Christmas goods, was dumped into the sea. The Age reported that, "The Great Ocean-road [sic] proved a boon to the passengers, who were enabled without much inconvenience to reach Wood's farm house, Apollo Bay. However, if the road were finished, the vessel's cargo could be safely conveyed to either Apollo Bay, the Wye River, or Lorne."

Completion and early usage

On 18 March 1922 the section from Eastern View to Lorne was officially opened with celebrations. However it was then closed from 10 May 1922 for further work; opening again on 21 December along with tolls to recoup construction costs. The charge, payable at Eastern View, was two shillings for motor cars, and 10 shillings for wagons with more than two horses.

In November 1932, the section from Lorne to Apollo Bay was finished, bringing the road to completion. The road was officially opened with Victoria's Lieutenant-Governor Sir William Irvine holding a ceremony near Lorne's Grand Pacific Hotel, and the road subsequently being acknowledged as the world's largest war memorial. At the time, The Age commented, "In the face of almost insurmountable odds, the Great Ocean Road has materialised from a dream or 'wild-cat scheme', as many dubbed it, into concrete reality". Although Hitchcock had died of heart disease on 22 August 1932, before the road was completed, his car was driven behind the governor's in the procession along the road during the opening ceremony. A memorial was constructed in his name on the road at Mount Defiance, near Lorne, and he is still affectionately considered the Father of the Road.

In its original state, the road was considered a formidable drive, fitting only a single vehicle comfortably at a time. Areas with sheer cliffs would be most hazardous, with only few places for drivers to pull over to allow others to proceed in the opposite direction; for £5, any "public-spirited citizen" could request that a crossover be cut into the road. On 2 October 1936, the road was handed to the State Government; with the deed for the road presented to the Victorian Premier at a ceremony at the Cathedral Rock toll gate. It was at this time that the tolls were also removed.

In 1939 with the death of the chairman of the Country Roads Board WTB McCormick, who was also honorary engineer for the Great Ocean Road Trust, it was decided to build a memorial arch across the road at Eastern View. The arch was built of timber logs on a stone base, with a tablet memorial to Mr McCormick on one side, and another to the returned servicemen on the other, was opened 4 November 1939. The arch was rebuilt in 1973, and again in 1983 when it was destroyed by the Ash Wednesday bushfires.

In 1962, the road was deemed by the Tourist Development Authority to be one of the world's great scenic roads. It also had sections widened between the Lorne Hotel and the Pacific Hotel to improve traffic, while aiming to preserve its character. Despite improvements, the road was still considered a challenging drive; the Victorian Police motor school even used it for training around 1966.

Over its life, the Great Ocean Road has been susceptible to natural elements; in 1960 the section at Princetown was partially washed away by water during storms. It experienced landslides on 11 August 1964, and in 1971; both closing sections of the road near Lorne. Because of the terrain surrounding the road, it was also closed due to bushfires in 1962 and 1964; particularly in areas with nearby campsites. In January 2011 a section of the overhanging cliffs collapsed due to heavy rain.

In 2011, the road was added to the Australian National Heritage List.

Road classification
Great Ocean Road was signed as State Route 100 between Torquay and Allansford in 1986; with Victoria's conversion to the newer alphanumeric system in the late 1990s, this was updated to route B100 in 1996.

The passing of the Road Management Act 2004 granted the responsibility of overall management and development of Victoria's major arterial roads to VicRoads: in 2004, VicRoads re-declared the road as Great Ocean Road (Arterial #4890), beginning at Surf Coast Highway at Torquay and ending at Princes Highway in Allansford.

Great Ocean Walk
In 2004, the Great Ocean Walk opened, connecting 104 km of walking trails that follow the coastline near the Great Ocean Road, stretching from Apollo Bay to the 12 Apostles.

Engineering heritage award 
The road received an Engineering Heritage National Marker from Engineers Australia as part of its Engineering Heritage Recognition Program.

Great Ocean Road law 
In December 2020, legislation went into effect to legally protect the Great Ocean Road – called the “Great Ocean Road and Environs Protection Act 2020”.

Major intersections

See also

 Great Ocean Walk
 Howard Hitchcock
 List of highways in Victoria
 Loch Ard Gorge
 London Arch
 The Grotto
 The Twelve Apostles
Cadel Evans Great Ocean Road Race

References

External links

Great Ocean Road – Official state government tourism site Retrieved 21 August 2017.
Great Ocean Road Great Ocean Road Regional Tourism Ltd. Retrieved 10 December 2018.
Great Ocean Road Guide Local's Guide to Exploring the Great Ocean Road Beyond the Guidebook.
Great Ocean Road Map An Interactive Map showcasing 150+ attractions, places of interest, campsites, waterfalls, petrol stations and more on and around the Great Ocean Road
Local accommodation website for the Great Ocean Road Retrieved 21 August 2017.
 
Great Ocean Road The Complete Guide

 
Tourist attractions in Victoria (Australia)
Tourist attractions in Geelong
Otway Ranges
Warrnambool
Highways in Victoria (Australia)
Scenic routes in Australia
Australian military memorials
Coastline of Victoria (Australia)
Victorian Heritage Register
Recipients of Engineers Australia engineering heritage markers
Transport in Barwon South West (region)
Victorian Heritage Register Barwon South West (region)